Junior Nazareno Sornoza Moreira (born 28 January 1994 in Portoviejo) is an Ecuadorian footballer who plays as an attacking midfielder for Ecuadorian Serie A club Independiente DV and the Ecuador national team.

Club career

Independiente del Valle

2011–2014
On August 24 of 2011, Sornoza made his career debut for the club, in a 1-0 home loss to Deportivo Quito. On September 25, Junior scored his first goals for the club in an emphatic 5-0 home win over Emelec. He finished his debut season having played 10 league games and scoring only 2 goals at the age of 17.
Sornoza's first game of the 2012 season was on February 4, in a 1-0 home win over LDU Loja. His only goal of the season came on December 2, in a 2-1 away loss to LDU Loja. Sornoza only scored 1 goal in 16 league matches played.
Junior's first league match of the 2013 Serie A season was on February 9, in a 0-0 home draw against Deportivo Quito. On May 25 Junior scored 4 goals against Ecuadorian giants Emelec 5-1 against Macara. Sornoza helped Independiente achieve second place league status, with 19 goals in 36 league matches.
Sornoza played and scored in Independiente's first ever participation of Copa Libertadores on February 18, against Union Espanola, drawing 2–2 at home. On March 12, in a Copa Libertadores group match, Sornoza scored a fantastic long range goal in injury time against Botafogo to give Independiente their first ever competition win. On March 27, Sornoza scored a late penalty against San Lorenzo to equalize 1-1 in the last minute of stoppage time. On April 9, Junior Sornoza guided Independiente del Valle to a 5-4 victory against Chilean club Union Espanola. He contributed to 4 of those goals with 3 assists and scoring a penalty. This was Independiente's first away victory in the Copa Libertadores although it was not enough to qualify to the next round. Junior Sornoza ended the tournament with 4 goals and 3 assists in 6 games.

Loan to Pachuca
On January 13, 2015, it was confirmed that Sornoza would be joining Liga MX side Pachuca on a one year loan deal.

Return to Independiente
On July 21, 2015, it was confirmed that Sornoza would be returning to Ecuador to play for Independiente.

Fluminense
On July 28, 2016, it was confirmed that Sornoza would join Fluminense in January 2017. He will spend 6 more months at Independiente.

Corinthians
On January 8, 2019, it was confirmed that Sornoza joined two-time FIFA Club World Cup champions Corinthians.Timão paid R$10 million for his services.

International career
Sornoza made his debut on September 6, 2014, scoring the fourth goal in an international friendly against Bolivia.

Career statistics

Club

National team

Honours
Corinthians
Campeonato Paulista: 2019
LDU Quito
Supercopa Ecuador: 2020

Individual
 Campeonato Carioca Team of the year: 2017

International goals
Scores and results list Ecuador's goal tally first.

References

External links
 
 
 
 

1994 births
Living people
People from Portoviejo
Ecuadorian footballers
Association football midfielders
Ecuadorian Serie A players
Campeonato Brasileiro Série A players
C.S.D. Independiente del Valle footballers
Liga MX players
C.F. Pachuca players
Fluminense FC players
Sport Club Corinthians Paulista players
L.D.U. Quito footballers
Ecuador international footballers
Ecuadorian expatriate footballers
Expatriate footballers in Mexico
Ecuadorian expatriate sportspeople in Mexico
Expatriate footballers in Brazil
Ecuadorian expatriate sportspeople in Brazil